Norman Spencer may refer to:

 Norman Spencer (politician) (1902–1966), member of the Canadian House of Commons
 Norman Spencer (composer) (1892–1985), film score composer
 Norm Spencer (1958–2020), Canadian actor and voice actor
 Norman Spencer (producer) (born 1914), British film producer/production manager
 Harrison Ford's character in the film What Lies Beneath